Moraxella porci is a Gram-negative, aerobic, catalase- and oxidase-positive, non-endospore-forming bacterium in the genus Moraxella, which was isolated from the brain of a pig suffering from meningitis.

References

External links
Type strain of Moraxella porci at BacDive -  the Bacterial Diversity Metadatabase

Moraxellaceae
Bacteria described in 2010